Al-Mustaʿṣim bi-llāh (1213 – 20 February 1258) was the 37th and last caliph from the Abbasid dynasty ruling from Baghdad. He held the title from 1242 until his death in 1258.

Biography
Abu Ahmad Abdallah ibn al-Mustansir Billah was a son of the Abbasid caliph al-Mustansir, and his mother was Hajir. He was born in 1213. After the death of his father, al-Musta'sim succeeded to the throne in late 1242.

He is noted for his opposition to the rise of Shajar al-Durr to the Egyptian throne during the Seventh Crusade. He sent a message from Baghdad to the Mamluks in Egypt that said: "If you do not have men there tell us so we can send you men." However, al-Musta'sim had to face the greatest menace against the caliphate since its establishment in 632: the invasion of the Mongol forces that, under Hulagu Khan, had already wiped out any resistance in Transoxiana and Khorasan. In 1255/1256 Hulagu forced the Abbasid to lend their forces for the campaign against Alamut.

News of the murder of al-Muazzam Turanshah and the inauguration of Shajar al-Durr as the new Sultan reached Syria. The Syrian Emirs were asked to pay homage to Shajar al-Durr but they refused and the Sultan's deputy in Al Karak rebelled against Cairo. The Syrian Emirs in Damascus gave the city to an-Nasir Yusuf the Ayyubid Emir of Aleppo and the Mamluks in Cairo responded by arresting the Emirs who were loyal to the Ayyubids in Egypt. In addition to the Ayyubids in Syria, the Abbasid caliph al-Musta'sim in Baghdad also rejected the Mamluk move in Egypt and refused to recognize Shajar al-Dur as a Sultan. The refusal of the Caliph to recognize Shajar al-Durr as the new Sultan was a great setback to the Mamluks in Egypt as the custom during the Ayyubid era was that the Sultan could gain legitimacy only through the recognition of the Abbasid Caliph. The Mamluks, therefore, decided to install Izz al-Din Aybak as a new Sultan. He married Shajar al-Durr who abdicated and passed the throne to him after she had ruled Egypt as sultan for about three months. Though the period of Shajar al-Durr's rule as a sultan was of short duration, it witnessed two important events in history: one, the expelling of Louis IX from Egypt, which marked the end of the Crusaders' ambition to conquer the southern Mediterranean basin; and two, the death of the Ayyubid dynasty and the birth of the Mamluk state which dominated the southern Mediterranean for decades.

To please the Caliph and secure his recognition, Aybak announced that he was merely a representative of the Abbasid Caliph in Baghdad. To placate the Ayyubids in Syria the Mamluks nominated an Ayyubid child named al-Sharaf Musa as a co-sultan. But this did not satisfy the Ayyubids and armed conflicts between the Mamluks and the Ayyubids broke out. The Caliph in Baghdad, preoccupied with the Mongols who were raiding territories not far from his capital, preferred to see the matter settled peacefully between the Mamluks in Egypt and the Ayyubids in Syria. Through negotiation and mediation of the Caliph that followed the bloody conflict, the Mamluks who manifested military superiority  reached an agreement with the Ayyubids that gave them control over southern Palestine including Gaza and Jerusalem and the Syrian coast. By this agreement the Mamluks not only added new territories to their dominion but also gained recognition for their rule.

In 1258, Hulagu invaded the Abbasid domain, which then consisted of only Baghdad, its immediate surroundings, and southern Iraq. In his campaign to conquer Baghdad, Hulagu Khan had several columns advance simultaneously on the city, and laid siege to it. The Mongols kept the people of Abbasid Caliphate in their capital and executed those who tried to flee.

Baghdad was sacked on February 10 and the caliph was killed by Hulagu Khan soon afterward. It is reckoned that the Mongols did not want to shed "royal blood", so they wrapped him in a rug and trampled him to death with their horses. Some of his sons were massacred as well. One of the surviving sons was sent as a prisoner to Mongolia, where Mongolian historians report he married and fathered children, but played no role in Islam thereafter.

The Travels of Marco Polo reports that upon finding the caliph's great stores of treasure which could have been spent on the defense of his realm, Hulagu Khan locked him in his treasure room without food or water, telling him "eat of thy treasure as much as thou wilt, since thou art so fond of it."

Fall of the Abbasids
Hulagu sent word to al-Musta'sim, demanding his acquiescence to the terms imposed by Möngke. al-Musta'sim refused, in large part due to the influence of his advisor and grand vizier, Ibn al-Alkami. Historians have ascribed various motives to Ibn al-Alkami's opposition to submission, including treachery and incompetence, and it appears that he lied to the caliph about the severity of the invasion, assuring al-Musta'sim that, if the capital of the caliphate was endangered by a Mongol army, the Islamic world would rush to its aid.

Although he replied to Hulagu's demands in a manner that the Mongol commander found menacing and offensive enough to break off further negotiation, al-Musta'sim neglected to summon armies to reinforce the troops at his disposal in Baghdad. Nor did he strengthen the city's walls. By January 11, the Mongols were close to the city, establishing themselves on both banks of the Tigris River so as to form a pincer around the city. Al-Musta'sim finally decided to do battle with them and sent out a force of 20,000 cavalry to attack the Mongols. The cavalry were decisively defeated by the Mongols, whose sappers breached dikes along the Tigris River and flooded the ground behind the Abbasid forces, trapping them.

Siege of Baghdad

The Abbasid Caliphate could supposedly call upon 50,000 soldiers for the defense of their capital, including the 20,000 cavalry under al-Musta'sim. However, these troops were assembled hastily, making them poorly equipped and disciplined. Although the caliph technically had the authority to summon soldiers from other sultanates (caliphate's deputy states) to defence, he neglected to do so. His taunting opposition had lost him the loyalty of the Mamluks, and the Syrian emirs, who he supported, were busy preparing their own defenses.

On January 29, the Mongol army began its siege of Baghdad, constructing a palisade and a ditch around the city. Employing siege engines and catapults, the Mongols attempted to breach the city's walls, and, by February 5, had seized a significant portion of the defenses. Realizing that his forces had little chance of retaking the walls, al-Musta'sim attempted to open negotiations with Hulagu, who rebuffed the caliph. Around 3,000 of Baghdad's notables also tried to negotiate with Hulagu but were murdered.

Five days later, on February 10, the city surrendered, but the Mongols did not enter the city until the 13th, beginning a week of massacre and destruction.

Destruction and massacre
Many historical accounts detailed the cruelties of the Mongol conquerors. Baghdad was a depopulated, ruined city for several decades and only gradually recovered some of its former glory.

Contemporary accounts state Mongol soldiers looted and then destroyed mosques, palaces, libraries, and hospitals. Priceless books from Baghdad's thirty-six public libraries were torn apart, the looters using their leather covers as sandals. Grand buildings that had been the work of generations were burned to the ground. The House of Wisdom (the Grand Library of Baghdad), containing countless precious historical documents and books on subjects ranging from medicine to astronomy, was destroyed. Claims have been made that the Tigris ran red from the blood of the scientists and philosophers killed. Citizens attempted to flee, but were intercepted by Mongol soldiers who killed in abundance, sparing no one, not even children. 

The caliph al-Musta'sim was captured and forced to watch as his citizens were murdered and his treasury plundered. According to most accounts, the caliph was killed by trampling. The Mongols rolled the caliph up in a rug, and rode their horses over him, as they believed that the earth would be offended if it were touched by royal blood. All but one of al-Musta'sim's sons were killed, and the sole surviving son was sent to Mongolia, where Mongolian historians report he married and fathered children, but played no role in Islam thereafter.

Hulagu had to move his camp upwind of the city, due to the stench of decay from the ruined city.

The historian David Morgan has quoted Wassaf (who himself was born 7 years after the razing of the city in 1265) describing the destruction: "They swept through the city like hungry falcons attacking a flight of doves, or like raging wolves attacking sheep, with loose reins and shameless faces, murdering and spreading terror...beds and cushions made of gold and encrusted with jewels were cut to pieces with knives and torn to shreds.  Those hiding behind the veils of the great Harem were dragged...through the streets and alleys, each of them becoming a plaything...as the population died at the hands of the invaders."

Aftermath
Hulagu left 3,000 Mongol soldiers behind to rebuild Baghdad. Ata-Malik Juvayni was later appointed governor of Baghdad, Lower Mesopotamia, and Khuzistan after Guo Kan went back to the Yuan dynasty to assist Kublai's conquest over the Song dynasty. Hulagu's Nestorian Christian wife, Dokuz Khatun, successfully interceded to spare the lives of Baghdad's Christian inhabitants. Hulagu offered the royal palace to the Nestorian Catholicos Mar Makikha, and ordered a cathedral to be built for him.

Initially, the fall of Baghdad came as a shock to the whole Muslim world; after many years of utter devastation, the city became an economic center where international trade, the minting of coins and religious affairs flourished under the Ilkhans.  The chief Mongol darughachi was thereafter stationed in the city.

Berke, who had converted to Islam in 1252, became enraged that Hulagu destroyed Baghdad. Muslim historian Rashid al Din quoted Berke Khan as sending the following message to Mongke Khan, protesting the attack on Baghdad, (not knowing Mongke had died in China): "He (Hulagu) has sacked all the cities of the Muslims. With the help of God I will call him to account for so much innocent blood."

Although hesitant at first to go to war with Hulagu out of Mongol brotherhood, the economic situation of the Golden Horde led him to declare war against the Ilkhanate. This became known as the Berke–Hulagu war.

Caliphate of Cairo

Al-Musta'sim was killed by Hulagu. Al-Musta'sim ruled from 5 December 1242 to 20 February 1258, for a period of 15 years, 2 months and 15 days. His death marked the final end of the caliphate as a political and religious entity in the Middle East.

The Mamluk Sultans of Egypt and Syria later appointed an Abbasid prince as caliph of Cairo, but these Mamluk Abbasid caliphs were marginalized and merely symbolic, with no temporal power and little religious influence. Even though they kept the title for about 250 years more, other than installing the Sultan in ceremonies, these caliphs had little importance. After the Ottomans conquered Egypt in 1517, the caliph of Cairo, al-Mutawakkil III was transported to Constantinople.

Centuries later, a tradition developed saying that, at this time, al-Mutawakkil III formally surrendered the title of caliph as well as its outward emblems—the sword and mantle of Muhammad—to the Ottoman sultan Selim I, establishing the Ottoman sultans as the new caliphal line. Some historians have noted that this story does not appear in the literature until the 1780s, suggesting that it was advanced to bolster the claims of caliphal jurisdiction over Muslims outside of the empire, as asserted in the 1774 Treaty of Küçük Kaynarca.

See also 
 Sulaiman Shah Abbasid official and commander-in-chief
 Yaqut al-Musta'simi a well-known calligrapher and secretary of al-Musta'sim.
 Mongol invasions of the Levant
 Tekuder, son of Hulagu and a Muslim convert.

References

Sources 

1213 births
1258 deaths
13th-century Abbasid caliphs
13th-century Arabs
13th-century executions
Monarchs taken prisoner in wartime
Executed monarchs
Muslims of the Seventh Crusade
People executed by the Mongol Empire
Sons of Abbasid caliphs